Bob Andy pie is a sweet pie. It is similar to a custard pie that is spiced with cinnamon and cloves. It is thought to have originated among the Amish and is named for two legendary gelding workhorses.

See also
 List of pies, tarts and flans

Notes

Sweet pies
American pies
Custard desserts
Pennsylvania Dutch cuisine